Mutalip Omarovich Alibekov (born 18 June 1997) is a Russian football player. He plays for Dynamo Makhachkala.

Club career
He made his debut for the main squad of PFC CSKA Moscow in the Russian Cup game against FC Yenisey Krasnoyarsk on 21 September 2016.

He made his Russian Football National League debut for FC Khimki on 16 September 2017 in a game against FC Tambov.

References

External links
 
 
 
 

1997 births
Footballers from Makhachkala
Living people
Russian footballers
Russia youth international footballers
Association football defenders
PFC CSKA Moscow players
FC Khimki players
FC Baltika Kaliningrad players
FC Smolevichi players
FC Dynamo Makhachkala players
Russian First League players
Russian Second League players
Belarusian Premier League players
Russian expatriate footballers
Expatriate footballers in Belarus
Russian expatriate sportspeople in Belarus